Jhulia Rayssa Mendes Leal (born 4 January 2008) is a Brazilian skateboarder who won a silver medal in women's street skateboarding at the 2020 Summer Olympics.

Skateboarding career
Leal was born and lived in Imperatriz, the second largest city in Maranhão, and alternates school studies with training. She started training the sport at the age of six, after getting her first skateboard on her 6th birthday, a gift from a family friend.

Leal first gained attention at the age of seven in internet videos of her skating in a tutu and jumping off tall structures on her skateboard. Leal's mother filmed the video on September 7, 2015, and sent it to Tony Hawk (the best-known skater in the world). The next day, the American reposted on Twitter and commented: "I don't know anything about it, but it's amazing: a fairytale-style heelflip in Brazil". At that time, he always made a post with the best maneuver of the day. She was dubbed "A Fadinha do Skate", translated roughly as "The Little Fairy of Skateboarding".

Early competitions
Mendes Leal competed in the 2019 Street League Skateboarding Championship in London, placing third with a score of 26.0, finishing above Alexis Sablone, Letícia Bufoni, and other skaters but behind fellow Brazilian Pamela Rosa and Australia's Hayley Wilson. In July 2019, she placed first at the Street League Skateboarding Championship in Los Angeles, leading the podium ahead of Pamela Rosa and Alana Smith. Also in 2019, she won a fourth place for her first X Games appearance.

2020 Olympic Games

She competed in the 2020 Summer Olympic Games in Tokyo at the age of 13, the youngest Brazilian ever to participate in the Olympic Games. In the skateboarding street competition she placed 3rd in the qualifiers. In the final, she won the silver medal. At 13 years and 203 days old on medal day, she was the youngest Olympic medalist in 85 years and became an instant celebrity, gaining 5.8 million new followers on Instagram. The young athlete also won The Visa Awards following her display of sportsmanship towards her opponents during the competition. The prize is a $50,000 donation to a charity of her choice.

2021-2024
On August 28, 2021, Rayssa won the opening leg of the 2021 Street League Skateboarding season, which took place in Salt Lake City, Utah, United States. In the last round of tricks, Rayssa needed an 8.3 rating to pass Funa Nakayama and amazingly got an 8.5 rating. It was the highest score in women's SLS history, as no woman had achieved a 360º flip followed by a handrail maneuver until this point in an official competition.

In April 2022, she won her first X Games gold medal, defeating Funa Nakayama and Chloe Covell. 

In November 2022 she won the 2022 SLS Super Crown in Rio de Janeiro.

References

2008 births
Living people
Brazilian skateboarders
Brazilian sportswomen
Female skateboarders
Olympic skateboarders of Brazil
Skateboarders at the 2020 Summer Olympics
Medalists at the 2020 Summer Olympics
Olympic silver medalists for Brazil
Olympic medalists in skateboarding
People from Imperatriz
X Games athletes
Sportspeople from Maranhão
21st-century Brazilian women